German submarine U-39 was a Type IXA U-boat of the Kriegsmarine that operated from 1938 to the first few days of World War II.

She was ordered by the Kriegsmarine on 29 July 1936 as part of the re-armament program (Aufrüstung) in Germany, which was illegal under the terms of the Treaty of Versailles. The keel for U-39 was laid down on 2 June 1937, by DeSchiMAG AG Weser of Bremen. She was commissioned on 10 December 1938 with Kapitänleutnant Gerhard Glattes in command.

On 14 September 1939, just 27 days after she began her first patrol, U-39 attempted to sink the British aircraft carrier  by firing two torpedoes at her. Due to a technical defect the torpedoes exploded before reaching their target. The U-39 was immediately hunted down by three British destroyers and disabled with depth charges. After the crew managed to resurface with the then sinking submarine all members were captured during the evacuation.

U-39 was the first German U-boat to be sunk in World War II.

Design
As one of the eight original German Type IX submarines, later designated IXA, U-39 had a displacement of  when at the surface and  while submerged. She had two shafts and two  propellers.

U-39 was fitted with six  torpedo tubes (four fitted at the bow and two at the stern), 22 torpedoes, one  SK C/32 naval gun, 180 rounds, and a  SK C/30 as well as a  C/30 anti-aircraft gun. The boat had a complement of forty-eight.

Service history

Patrol and Sinking
U-39 conducted only one war patrol during her entire career, as part of the 6th U-boat Flotilla. She headed into the North Sea and eventually circumnavigated the British Isles. Prior to her sinking, U-39 was attacked in the North Sea on 10 September while en route to the British Isles. She was depth charged by an unidentified British vessel and was forced to dive to 100 meters (328 feet) to escape the attack.

Lookouts spotted the torpedo tracks and Ark Royal turned towards the attack, reducing her cross-section and causing both torpedoes to miss and explode short of their target. Following the failed attack, three British destroyers in the vicinity of the Ark Royal, and  detected U-39. All three destroyers depth charged the U-boat and seconds after Firedrake released her depth charges, U-39 surfaced. Foxhound, which was the closest to the U-boat, picked up 25 crew members while Faulknor rescued 11 and Firedrake saved the remaining eight. The crewmen were then taken ashore in Scotland and spent the rest of the war in various prisoner-of-war camps, including the Tower of London, before being shipped to Canada.

Aftermath
According to a report by the Seekriegsleitung (German Supreme Naval Command) on 22 September 1939, U-32 and U-53 were heading back to their home port of Kiel while only U-31 and U-35 remained in the operational area north of the British Isles. According to plan, U-39 should also have made for Kiel. However, there had been no contact with the U-boat for several days. A lack of response from U-39, despite several requests to give her current location, began to fuel rumours that she was sunk. This belief was later confirmed by a British radio transmission detailing the arrival of the first German prisoners of war who were members of the Kriegsmarine, at a London railway station a few days later.

References

Bibliography

External links

German Type IX submarines
U-boats commissioned in 1938
U-boats sunk in 1939
World War II submarines of Germany
World War II shipwrecks in the Atlantic Ocean
U-boats sunk by depth charges
1938 ships
Ships built in Bremen (state)
U-boats sunk by British warships
Maritime incidents in September 1939